"The Croppy Boy" is an Irish ballad set in 1798 rising  relating to the despair of a doomed young "croppy" or rebel.

Broadside versions
Versions of the ballad first appeared shortly after the rising sung by street pedlars and there are several broadside songs printed. These typically include the phrase "500 Guineas"  or "one thousand pounds", and are also sung to the tune of the old Irish air Cailín Óg a Stór.  They may be the basis for the later ballad, Lady Franklin's Lament.

Malone version

A version by Carroll Malone first appeared in the Irish newspaper The Nation in 1845 and concerns a fictional young man who stops in a church on his way to fight. He sees a cloaked figure in a confessional and kneels for the penitential rite. The figure is actually a British officer who sought refuge from the rebels by hiding in the confessional. After the youth completes his confession, the officer reveals himself and proceeds to arrest the youth. The legend is the subject of Canadian artist Charlotte Schreiber's painting The Croppy Boy (The Confession of an Irish Patriot), now on display in the National Gallery of Canada.

References 

 Music in James Joyce's works
 Croppy Boy (Version II) by Carroll Malone

Irish Rebellion of 1798
Irish songs
Ballads
Ballads of the Irish Rebellion of 1798
Year of song unknown
Songwriter unknown